Heinrich Siebenhaar (25 February 1883 – 25 June 1946) was a German gymnast. He competed in the men's artistic individual all-around event at the 1908 Summer Olympics.

References

1883 births
1946 deaths
German male artistic gymnasts
Olympic gymnasts of Germany
Gymnasts at the 1908 Summer Olympics
Place of birth missing